La Clique is a cabaret/variety show with Australian roots first conceived for the 2004 season of The Edinburgh Festival Fringe. It was originally performed in The Famous Spiegeltent with a small circular stage at fringe festivals, but since 2008 it was also performed for extended periods in permanent theatres keeping the same characteristic stage.

Notable Performers
German Cabaret diva, songwriter, and performance artist Bernie Dieter,
Guinness World Record breaking contortionist Captain Frodo,
Australian-born actress, dancer and cabaret performer Meow Meow,
British-born performer and self-taught sword swallower Miss Behave and
Irish musician, vocalist, and actress Camille O'Sullivan.

Awards
 2009: Nominated for Les Globes de Cristal La Meilleure Comédie Musicale 2009 (Best Musical or Comedy) for the Paris 2009 season.
 2009: Laurence Olivier Award for Best Entertainment for the London 2008/09 season at the Hippodrome, London.
 2005: Brighton Festival Fringe Best of The Fringe Festival award.

Seasons
 Edinburgh Festival Fringe, United Kingdom; August 2004
 Brighton Festival Fringe, United Kingdom; May 2005 
 Edinburgh Festival Fringe, United Kingdom; August 2005
 Melbourne International Arts Festival, Australia; October - November 2005
 Adelaide Fringe Festival, Australia; March 2006
 Brighton Festival Fringe, United Kingdom; May 2006
 Edinburgh Festival Fringe, United Kingdom; August 2006
 Just for Laughs festival, Montreal, Canada; July 2006
 New York, United States of America; August - October 2006
 Melbourne International Arts Festival, Melbourne, Australia; October - December 2006
 Sydney Festival, Australia; January 2007
 Auckland Festival, New Zealand; March 2007
 Just for Laughs festival, Montreal, Canada; July 2007
 Dublin Fringe Festival, Ireland; September 2007
 Melbourne International Arts Festival, Melbourne, Australia; October - December 2007
 Edinburgh Festival Fringe, United Kingdom; August 2007
 Sydney Festival, Australia; January 2008
 Adelaide Fringe Festival, Australia; March 2008
 Edinburgh Festival Fringe, United Kingdom; August 2008 
 Dublin Fringe Festival, Ireland; September 2008
 Hippodrome, London, United Kingdom; October 2008 – June 2009
 Sydney Festival, Australia; January 2009
 Auckland Festival, New Zealand; March 2009
 Just for Laughs festival, Nantes, France; April 2009
 Aarhus Festuge, Denmark; August 2009
 Dublin Fringe Festival, Ireland; September 2009
 Bobino, Paris, France; September 2009 – June 2010
 The Roundhouse, London, United Kingdom; November 2009 – January 2010 
 Showzam! Festival of Circus, Magic and New Variety, Blackpool, United Kingdom; February 2010
 Adelaide Festival of Arts, Australia; March 2010
 Stockholm Kulturfestival, Gröna Lund, Sweden; August – September 2010
 Pécs, Hungary; August 2010
 Aarhus Festuge, Denmark; August – September 2010
 Lund, Sweden; September 2010
 Halmstad, Sweden; September 2010
 Umeå, Sweden; September – October 2010

External links
 La Clique website

References

Cabaret
Circuses